Alexander Lebedev-Frontov (26 August 1960 – 8 January 2022) was a Russian painter, collagist, and musician.

Life and career
Lebedev-Frontov was born on 26 August 1960 in Leningrad, USSR. He was one of the precursors of industrial and noise music in Soviet Russia. In 1987 he began an underground music-project named Линия Масс (Mass Line).
In 1994 he joined National Bolshevik Party and started cooperation with the newspaper Limonka. In 1995 Lebedev-Frontov founded record label Ultra that focused primarily on industrial music. In 1996 he created Vetrophonia. In 1997 Lebedev-Frontov re-created Линия Масс . In 1999 Lebedev-Frontov was co-founder of art-gallery GEZ21 (Галерея экспериментального звука). He died in Saint Petersburg on 8 January 2022, at the age of 61.

Discography

Linija Mass
 1998 — Fanatisch Eiskalt Maschine
 2000 — Genus Ferrum
 2001 — Eiserne Revolution
 2002 — Pas D’Acier
 2004 — Triumph Stali
 2007—1987
 2007 — Trud /
 2007 — Mechano-Faktura
 2007 — Proletkult
 2007 — Kinematika Mechanizmov

Veprisuicida
 1996 — Веприсуицида
 1999 — Veprisuicida / Cisfinitum — Heavy Metal Cyclothymia / Отклонение От Симметрии
 1999 — Comforter / Veprisuicida
 2000 — Chinese Meat
 2000 — K2 / Veprisuicida
 2001 — Veprisuicida & Organomehanizm — Collaboration
 2003 — Vaginacentrism
 2005 — Veprisuicida & Organomehanizm — Electro-Pop

Vetrophonia
 1998 — Kuomintang
 1999 — Risveglio Di Una Citta / Futurogrammatika
 Magmax / Vetrophonia
 2000 — K2 / Vetrophonia
 2000 — Strappadology
 2001 — Symformoza
 2003 — Simultannost
 2005 — Promzona
 2005 — Shumographika
 2008 — Generalissimus Chiang Kaishek

Stalnoy Pakt
 2002 — Decima Mas / Il Principe Nero
 2002 — Okkupacija
 2003 — Stalnoy Pakt / Rasthof Dachau — Die Toten An Die Lebenden
 2004 — Russia’s Awakening
 2005 — Anno Mundi Ardentis # Legion Chesty
 2006 — O Roma O Morte!
 2007 — Stalnoy Pakt — Anthesteria — Mikhail Vavich — Dedicated To The Russo-Japanese War 1904—1905

Т.А.У.
 2001 — Bioni
 2007 — La Splendeur, Geometrique / Urbanomania

References

External links
 Aleksandr Lebedev-Frontov on Discogs
 Some political works of Lebedev-Frontov 
 Interview with Lebedev-Frontov

1960 births
2022 deaths
20th-century Russian painters
21st-century Russian painters
Russian male painters
Collage artists
Military personnel from Saint Petersburg
Noise musicians
Industrial musicians
National Bolshevik Party politicians
Painters from Saint Petersburg